Egelston Township is a general law township (known in other states as a civil township) of Muskegon County in the U.S. state of Michigan.  As of the 2010 census, the township population was 9,909.

History
Egleston Township was established in 1859.

Geography

Government
Egelston Township, a general law township, is run under a board system of management.  Its elected officials include a Supervisor, Clerk, Treasurer and four trustees.

Township Board
The 2016-2020 Board consisted of Supervisor John Holter, Clerk Joan Raap, Treasurer Kelly Gerard, and trustees Bob Coon, Renea Foster, Brent Hartman, and Alex Maginity. Most of the officials were elected in 2016.

The current Board consists of Supervisor John Holter, Clerk Joan Raap, Treasurer Kelly Gerard, and trustees Renea Foster, Alex Maginity, Brent Hartman, and Bob Coon. The term ends for all positions in 2020.

Planning Commission
The Current Planning Commission consists of Chairperson Don Darke, Vice Chair Sheila Quillin, Secretary Cari Avery, Board Trustee Bob Coon, and Jerry Shaefer.

Zoning Board of Appeals
The current Board of Appeals consists of Brent Hartman, Bambi Rhinehart, Cari Avery, Scott Rogers and Bryan Mathis.

Egelston Township Branch, Muskegon Area District Library
The current staff consists of Head Librarian Andrew Hammond, Library Assistant Wendy Williamson and Library Assistant Chad Whitten.

Demographics
As of the census of 2000, there were 9,537 people, 3,458 households, and 2,596 families residing in the township. The racial makeup of the township was 94.04% White, 1.05% African American, 1.05% Native American, 0.30% Asian, 1.48% from other races, and 2.08% from two or more races. Hispanic or Latino of any race were 3.98% of the population.

There were 3,458 households, out of which 38.4% had children under the age of 18 living with them, 57.7% were married couples living together, 12.1% had a female householder with no husband present, and 24.9% were non-families. 20.0% of all households were made up of individuals, and 8.0% had someone living alone who was 65 years of age or older.  The average household size was 2.75 and the average family size was 3.14.

In the township the population was spread out, with 29.2% under the age of 18, 9.0% from 18 to 24, 29.8% from 25 to 44, 22.2% from 45 to 64, and 9.8% who were 65 years of age or older.  The median age was 34 years. For every 100 females, there were 98.8 males.  For every 100 females age 18 and over, there were 94.4 males.

The median income for a household in the township was $37,557, and the median income for a family was $41,810. Males had a median income of $33,140 versus $25,066 for females. The per capita income for the township was $16,489.  About 6.9% of families and 8.7% of the population were below the poverty line, including 13.2% of those under age 18 and 8.5% of those age 65 or over.

Schools
The Muskegon Oakridge Public Schools District serves the Egelston area and is part of the Muskegon Area Intermediate School District.

References

External links
 Oakridge Public Schools
 Oakridge Alumni Association
 Muskegon Area Intermediate School District
 Egelston Township
 Muskegon Area District Library Egelston Branch

Townships in Muskegon County, Michigan
Populated places established in 1859
Townships in Michigan
1859 establishments in Michigan